Henrik Heggheim (born 22 April 2001) is a Norwegian professional footballer who plays as a centre-back for Vålerenga, on loan from Danish Superliga club Brøndby.

Career

Viking
Growing up in the Eiganes district of Stavanger, Norway, Heggheim started playing football for the Viking FK youth academy at age 5.

On 11 June 2020, he signed a professional contract with Viking until the end of the 2021 season. Three weeks later, on 1 July 2020, he made his Eliteserien debut for the club in a 2–0 win against Sandefjord. After playing nine consecutive matches in the league, his contract was extended until the end of the 2023 season on 13 August 2020.

Brøndby
On 30 August 2021, Heggheim joined the 2020–21 Danish Superliga champions Brøndby IF on a four-year contract. He made his debut on 23 September in a 8–1 win over Allerød FK in the Danish Cup. He made his first European appearance for the club on 30 September in a 3–0 loss to Lyon in the UEFA Europa League group stage. On 24 October, he made his domestic league debut in a 2–1 win over FC Copenhagen in the Copenhagen Derby. Heggheim scored his first goal for Brøndby – as well as his first senior goal – on 28 February 2022, which proved to be the winner in a 1–0 league victory against SønderjyskE.

On 14 March 2023, Heggheim joined Vålerenga on loan until 30 June 2023.

Career statistics

References

2001 births
Living people
Sportspeople from Stavanger
Norwegian footballers
Norwegian expatriate footballers
Norway under-21 international footballers
Association football defenders
Viking FK players
Brøndby IF players
Vålerenga Fotball players
Eliteserien players
Danish Superliga players
Expatriate men's footballers in Denmark
Norwegian expatriate sportspeople in Denmark